Carreira is a Portuguese surname. Notable people with the surname include:

Music
António Carreira (1520/30-1597), Portuguese composer and organist of the Renaissance
David Carreira (born 1991), French-born Portuguese pop, dance, hip hop and R&B singer, son of singer Tony Carreira
Mickael Carreira (born 1986), Portuguese pop singer, son of singer Tony Carreira
Tony Carreira (born 1963), Portuguese musician, singer

Sports
Diego Alves Carreira (born 1985), Brazilian football goalkeeper
Diogo Carreira (born 1978), Portuguese basketball player
Hugo Miguel Martins Carreira (born 1979), Portuguese footballer
Luis Carreira (1976–2012), Portuguese motorcycle road racer
Paulo Jorge Carreira Nunes (born 1970), Portuguese footballer
Christina Carreira (born 2000), Canadian-born American ice dancer

Others
Ana Maria Teles Carreira, Angolan diplomat
Erick M. Carreira (born 1963), Cuban-born organic chemist
Henrique Medina Carreira (born 1931), Portuguese jurist, minister
Iko Carreira, Angolan army general and minister
Joaquim Justino Carreira (1950–2013), Portuguese-born Brazilian Roman Catholic bishop

See also
Carreira (disambiguation)

Portuguese-language surnames